The Stig-Helmer Story is a Swedish comedy film which was released to cinemas in Sweden on 25 December 2011, directed by Lasse Åberg. The film is the sixth in the series about Stig-Helmer Olsson.

Cast 
Lasse Åberg as Stig-Helmer (71 years old)
Tobias Jacobsson as Stig-Helmer (20 years old)
Filip Arsic Johnsson as Stig-Helmer (12 years old)
Jon Skolmen as Ole Bramserud
Ida Högberg as Annika (18 years old)
Tove Edfeldt as Hjördis
Bill Hugg as Julle
Jonas Bane as Biffen (20 years old)
Nils Bodner as Biffen (12 years old)
Andreas Nilsson as the major
Elisabet Carlsson as Märta
Stefan Sauk as Biffen's father
Cecilia Ljung as Svea
 Patrick Jakobsson as Mr Cheng

Reception 
The film has received mixed reviews. The Swedish newspaper Aftonbladet rated the film as 3/5, Expressen as 2/5, Metro as 3/5 and Svenska Dagbladet as 4/6.

References

External links 

”Stig-Helmer är snällare än jag” 

Swedish comedy films
2011 films
2010s Swedish-language films
Films directed by Lasse Åberg
2011 comedy films
2010s Swedish films